SAPIENT is a program of the Erasmus Mundus initiative to provide scholarship opportunities to South African students to study in Europe.

The project is coordinated by Radboud University Nijmegen, and comprises a consortium of colleges and universities from the International Research Universities Network and their South African partners:

 Jagiellonian University, Krakow
 Radboud University Nijmegen
 University of Duisburg-Essen
 University of Münster
 University of Poitiers
 University of Siena
 University of KwaZulu-Natal
 University of Limpopo
 University of Pretoria
 Rhodes University
 University of South Africa
 Stellenbosch University

References

External links 
 

Erasmus Mundus Programmes
Scholarships